Mustafa Semavi Eyice (9 December 1922 in Istanbul, Turkey – 28 May 2018 in Istanbul, Turkey) was a Turkish art historian and archaeologist,  who specialised in the study of Byzantine and Ottoman art in Istanbul. Professor Eyice is widely regarded as the pioneer of Byzantine studies in Turkey.

Early life
Born on 9 December 1922 at Kadıköy, Istanbul, to parents originating from Amasra, he grew up in Istanbul, where he attended the primary and secondary French schools in Kadıköy district,  and graduated in 1943 from the Galatasaray Lisesi in Beyoğlu.

During  World War II, he went to Germany to learn the language. During the war years he attended in two different periods lectures in archeology, history and art history respectively at the Universities of Vienna and Berlin (at that time heavily bombed).

In 1945, he was forced to leave Berlin, and was evacuated to Denmark and Sweden. In the same year, he returned to Turkey to undertake the study of art history at Istanbul University, where he graduated in 1948 under Ernst Diez with a thesis on the minarets of Istanbul.

He then worked as a research assistant in the Department of Art History, and earned his doctorate in 1952 with the work Side'nin Bizans Dönemine Ait Yapıları. In 1955, he was appointed associate professor after publishing his work Istanbul’da Son Devir Bizans Mimarisi. In the same year, Semavi Eyice published Istanbul, Petit guide à travers les monuments byzantins et turcs, a book which is still among the most cited works in the field of Constantinople's art history.

Academic career
After founding the Byzantine Art Department at İstanbul University in 1963, he was appointed the next year first full professor of the newly established chair. In the course of his academic career he has lectured at numerous institutions, including  Ankara Hacettepe University and Istanbul Mimar Sinan Fine Arts University, and abroad at the Ėcole des Hautes Ėtudes, the Sorbonne in Paris, and the Universities of Geneva and Bologna. In addition to his teaching activity, he has engaged in archaeological field research in various places including the region of Binbirkilise in south-central Anatolia, various Byzantine settlements around Silifke in Cilicia (among them Karakabaklı), and Thrace.

Since 1946 he has published 15 books and more than 500 papers and contributions to encyclopedic works, and until his death he has been fully active in research and teaching. His library, containing more than 30,000 rare editions and books dealing not only with Byzantine history and art, but also with Islamic, Turkish and Ottoman history, art and literature, is now hosted by the Istanbul Research Institute. In addition to his main scientific field in Byzantine art and archaeology, and Turkish art in the Ottoman era, he has done research on foreign painters and travellers who visited Turkey, and has also studied the traces left by the Genoese in Turkey.

Professor Eyice was a member of several research organizations, including the German Archaeological Institute. In 1955, he received the Légion d'honneur Medal from the Académie de France, and in the same year he was awarded the Prize of the Turkish Academy of Sciences. In 2011, President of Turkey Abdullah Gül awarded Prof. Eyice with the Presidential Culture and Arts Grand Prix.

Semavi Eyice was appointed Professor Emeritus in 1990. He has been married to Kamran Yalgın since 1954.

Selected works
Istanbul, Petit guide à travers les monuments byzantins et turcs Istanbul: Istanbul Matbaası, 1955
Son devir Bizans mimarisi: Istanbul'da Palaiologos'lar devri anıtları Istanbul, 1963
Recherches archéologiques à Karadağ (Binbirkilise) et dans la région de Karaman Istanbul, 1971
İstanbul yazıları. Istanbul: Türkiye Turing ve Otomobil Kurumu, 1992, .
Some Byzantine towns in Cilicia Tracheia In 150 years of German Archaeological Institute, Mainz 1981, pp. 204–209.

A complete bibliography of his publications can be found at

References

External links
 Other works of Semavi Eyice
 Publications at the Common Library Network

1922 births
2018 deaths
Archaeologists from Istanbul
Turkish art historians
Turkish Byzantinists
Istanbul University alumni
Academic staff of Istanbul University
Galatasaray High School alumni
20th-century Turkish historians
21st-century Turkish historians
Historians of Byzantine art
Byzantine archaeologists
Turkish expatriates in Germany